Victimized is the debut album by Chilean thrash metal/death metal band  Criminal, released in 1994. Previously the band had recorded two demos.  It has sold 1000 copies in Chile, and was distributed in other countries like Mexico, Argentina and Japan. Some music videos from songs from this album were broadcast on MTV Latin America.

Track listing 
 "Self Destruction" – 2:41
 "Under My Skin" – 4:02
 "Worse" – 3:08
 "Downwards" – 3:43
 "Pressure" – 2:58
 "New Disorder" – 3:42
 "Gusano" – 2:40
 "Crucified" – 3:59
 "Psychopath" – 3:36
 "Stillborn" – 4:05
All songs composed by Criminal.

Criminal (band) albums
1994 debut albums